Henry C. Castellanos (1828–1896) was a New Orleans attorney and judge best known for writing the antebellum compendium New Orleans As It Was, in 1895.  It was reissued in 2006, with an introduction by Judith Kelleher Schafer.

References 

American judges
1828 births
1896 deaths
19th-century American judges